Saint Martin of Vertou (527–601) was a hermit and abbot, founder of Vertou Abbey, and the evangelist of the region around Nantes in Francia. He is sometimes known as the Apostle of the Herbauges.

Life
Martin was distinguished by his virtue, learning, and talent. He was ordained by 
Saint Felix, Bishop of Nantes, who also made him archdeacon of the church of Nantes and charged him with converting the inhabitants of the town and the surrounding area to Christianity.

In about 577, he withdrew into solitude in an area of wasteland on the right bank of the Sèvre Nantaise. Gradually, as people were drawn to him by his sanctity, he built a church and enlarged his hermitage, which became Vertou Abbey. He also founded other religious communities, including Durieu Abbey, where he died in 601 at the age of seventy-four.

There is a legend that he planted his pilgrim's staff in the middle of the abbey courtyard at Vertou and that it took root, growing into a yew tree, which appears on the arms of the commune of Vertou.

His feast day is 24 October.

References

Sources
 Catholic.org (Saints and Angels): Martin of Vertou
 SPQN Patron Saints Index: Martin of Vertou

Medieval Breton saints
7th-century Christian saints
527 births
601 deaths
6th-century Breton people